Harald Bosio (2 January 1906 – 2 December 1980) was an Austrian cross-country skier, ski jumper, and Nordic combined skier who competed in the 1920s and in the 1930s. He was born in Judenburg.

Olympic Games
Bosio competed in the 1928 Winter Olympics, in the 1932 Winter Olympics, and in the 1936 Winter Olympics. In 1932 he finished 21st in the shorter cross-country skiing event and 29th in the Nordic combined competition. He also participated in the ski jumping event but did not finish. Four years later at the 1936 Winter Olympics he finished 28th in the 18 km cross-country skiing event. As member of the Austrian cross-country relay team he finished eighth in the 4x10 km relay competition.

World championships
He won a bronze individual medal at the 1933 FIS Nordic World Ski Championships in Innsbruck.

References

Harald Bosio's profile at Sports Reference.com
Mention of death

1906 births
1980 deaths
Austrian male cross-country skiers
Austrian male ski jumpers
Austrian male Nordic combined skiers
Olympic cross-country skiers of Austria
Olympic Nordic combined skiers of Austria
Olympic ski jumpers of Austria
Ski jumpers at the 1928 Winter Olympics
Cross-country skiers at the 1932 Winter Olympics
Nordic combined skiers at the 1932 Winter Olympics
Ski jumpers at the 1932 Winter Olympics
Cross-country skiers at the 1936 Winter Olympics
FIS Nordic World Ski Championships medalists in Nordic combined
People from Judenburg
Sportspeople from Styria
20th-century Austrian people